In American history, the Fire-Eaters were a group of pro-slavery  Democrats in the Antebellum South who urged the separation of Southern states into a new nation, which became the Confederate States of America.  The dean of the group was Robert Rhett of South Carolina. Some sought to revive America's participation in the Atlantic slave trade, which had been illegal since 1808.

Impact
By radically urging secession in the South, the Fire-Eaters demonstrated the high level of sectionalism existing in the U.S. during the 1850s, and they materially contributed to the outbreak of the Civil War (1861–1865). As early as 1850, there was a Southern minority of pro-slavery extremists who did much to weaken the fragile unity of the nation.  Led by such men as Edmund Ruffin, Robert Rhett, Louis T. Wigfall, and William Lowndes Yancey, this group was dubbed "Fire-Eaters" by Northerners.  At an 1850 convention in Nashville, Tennessee, the Fire-Eaters urged Southern secession, citing irrevocable differences between the North and the South, and they inflamed passions by using propaganda against the North.  However, the Compromise of 1850 and other moderate counsel abated the ardor of the Fire-Eaters for a time.

In the latter half of the 1850s, the group reemerged. During the election of 1856, Fire-Eaters used threats of secession to persuade Northerners, who valued saving the Union over fighting slavery, to vote for James Buchanan. They used several recent events for propaganda, among them "Bleeding Kansas" and the Sumner-Brooks Affair, to accuse the North of trying to abolish slavery immediately. Using effective propaganda against 1860 presidential candidate Abraham Lincoln, the nominee of the anti-slavery Republican Party, the Fire-Eaters were able to convince many Southerners of this. However, Lincoln, despite abolitionist sentiment within the party, had promised not to abolish slavery in the Southern states, but only to prevent its expansion into the Western territories. They first targeted South Carolina, which passed an Ordinance  of Secession in December 1860. Wigfall, for one, actively encouraged an attack on Fort Sumter to prompt Virginia and other upper Southern States to secede as well.  The Fire-Eaters helped to unleash a chain reaction that led directly to the formation of the Confederate States of America and the Civil War. Their influence waned quickly after the start of major fighting.

Notable Fire-Eaters

Albert G. Brown
Joseph E. Brown
Thomas R. R. Cobb
James Dunwoody Brownson De Bow, publisher of De Bow's Review
James Gadsden
Maxcy Gregg
Thomas C. Hindman
Laurence M. Keitt
Lucius Quintus Cincinnatus Lamar
William Porcher Miles
Edward A. O'Neal
Edmund Pettus
John A. Quitman
John J. Pettus, Governor of Mississippi, who would lead the state in secession
Francis Wilkinson Pickens, Governor of South Carolina; authorized firing on Star of the West
Roger Atkinson Pryor
Robert Rhett
Edmund Ruffin
Nathaniel Beverley Tucker
Louis Wigfall
William Lowndes Yancey
David Levy Yulee

References
Notes

Bibliography
Walther, Eric H. (1992) The Fire-Eaters Baton Rouge: Louisiana State University Press. 
 Walther, Eric H. (2006) William Lowndes Yancey: The Coming of the Civil War

External links
Great American History: The Fire-Eaters

Secessionist organizations in the United States
1850s in the United States
Secession crisis of 1860–61
American Civil War political groups
History of the Southern United States
 
Origins of the American Civil War